Bernd Dichtl is a retired slalom canoeist who competed for West Germany in the 1970s.

He won a gold medal in the K-1 team event at the 1975 ICF Canoe Slalom World Championships in Skopje.

References
Overview of athlete's results at canoeslalom.net

German male canoeists
Possibly living people
Year of birth missing (living people)
Medalists at the ICF Canoe Slalom World Championships